Avdalen is a small,  long side valley located off of the main Utladalen valley in Årdal Municipality in Vestland county, Norway. A blues concert is held at Avdalen each year in June. It has become increasingly popular.

The Årdal mountain touring club maintains a staffed lodge at the former Avdal farm. The Avdal farm was first occupied in 16th century and was vacated in 1962. The farm has undergone a restoration, and currently provides meals as well as accommodation for tourists. It can be reached by a  car ride from the village of Øvre Årdal to Hjelle, followed by a 45-minute hike. The last part of the hike is very steep and illustrates the challenge of daily life for the former residents.

References

External links
Map of the Utladalen Landscape Protection Area and the adjacent Jotunheim National Park (Avdalen is marked near the bottom)
Picture of the Avdal Farm 

Valleys of Vestland
Årdal